Dave Lislegard (born March 6, 1973) is an American politician serving in the Minnesota House of Representatives since 2019. A member of the Democratic–Farmer–Labor Party (DFL), Lislegard represents District 7B in northeast Minnesota, which includes the city of Virginia and parts of St. Louis County in the Iron Range.

Early life, education, and career
Lislegard attended Babbit-Embarrass High School. He studied at Mesabi Range College for two years and later attended the University of Minnesota Duluth, graduating with a Bachelor of Science in political science and communications.

Lislegard worked at the LTV steel plant in Hoyt Lakes, Minnesota, until he was laid off in 2001. He now works in business relations for Lakehead Constructors. He was a member of the Aurora, Minnesota, city council and was elected mayor in 2017.

Minnesota House of Representatives
Lislegard was elected to represent District 6B in the Minnesota House of Representatives in 2018 after Representative Jason Metsa retired, and has been reelected every two years since. Following the 2022 redistricting, Lislegard was elected to represent District 7B.

Lislegard chairs the Property Tax Division and sits on the Taxes, Environment and Natural Resources, and Veterans and Military Affairs Committees.

Electoral history

Personal life
Lislegard and his wife, Lisa, reside in Aurora, Minnesota. They have two children.

References

External links

 Official House of Representatives website
 Official campaign website

1973 births
Living people
People from Aurora, Minnesota
University of Minnesota Duluth alumni
Democratic Party members of the Minnesota House of Representatives
21st-century American politicians